Corrine Hammond is an Australian darts player who plays in events of the World Darts Federation (WDF).

Career
Hammond qualified for the 2016 BDO World Darts Championship and lost to Deta Hedman in the first round 2–0. In 2016, she reached the Quarter-final of the World Masters and BDO World Trophy. She qualified for the 2017 BDO World Darts Championship where she finished runner-up, losing to Lisa Ashton in the final.

World Championship results

BDO/WDF
 2016: First round (lost to Deta Hedman 0–2)
 2017: Runner-up (lost to Lisa Ashton 0–3)
 2018: First round (lost to Fallon Sherrock 1–2)
 2019: First round (lost to Fallon Sherrock 0–2)
 2020: Semi-finals (lost to Lisa Ashton 0–2)
 2022: Second round (lost to Rhian O'Sullivan 1–2)

References

External links
Profile and stats on Darts Database

1982 births
Living people
Australian darts players
British Darts Organisation players
Professional Darts Corporation women's players